Shiyakusho-mae is a Hiroden station (tram stop) on Hiroden Ujina Line located in front of Hiroshima City Hall, Ote-machi 4-chome, Naka-ku, Hiroshima.

Routes
From Shiyakusho-mae Station, there are three of Hiroden Streetcar routes.

 Hiroshima Station - Hiroshima Port Route
 Hiroden-nishi-hiroshima - Hiroshima Port Route
 Yokogawa Station - Hiroden-honsha-mae Route

Connections
█ Ujina Line
  
Chuden-mae — Shiyakusho-mae — Takanobashi

Around station
Hiroshima City Hall
Hiroshima Naka Ward Office
JA Building
Hiroshima Prefectural Hiroshima Kokutaiji High School
Hiroshima Prefectural Nishi High School
Hiroshima Chuo Yubin-kyoku - main post office
Hiroshima City Naka Ward Library

History
Opened as "Makomo-bashi" tram stop, named from the bridge "Makomo", on November 23, 1914.
Renamed to "Kōkaidō-mae", named from "Hiroshima public hall" - hormer International Conference Center Hiroshima, in 1919.
Closed from June 10, 1944 to October 31, 1946.
Reopened and renamed to the present name "Shiyakusho-mae", named from "Hiroshima City Office", on November 1, 1946

See also
Hiroden Streetcar Lines and Routes

References

Shiyakusho-mae Station
Railway stations in Japan opened in 1914